TDS may refer to:

Business and finance
 Tax Deducted at Source, in India
 Tenancy Deposit Scheme (England and Wales)
 Telephone and Data Systems, a US company
 TDS Telecom, a subsidiary
 Thompson Dorfman Sweatman, a law firm, Winnipeg, Canada

Technology
 Tabular Data Stream, a computer protocol
 TeX Directory Structure, for TeX system files
 Transposition driven scheduling, in parallel computer systems
 Time-driven switching, in data communications
 Technical data sheet in CDMA technology
 An oscilloscope series by Tektronix
 Tower Defense Simulator, a Roblox game made by the group Paradoxum Games

Military
 Tonga Defence Services
 United States Army Trial Defense Service

Science
 Ter die sumendum, a medical abbreviation for 3 times daily
 Thermal desorption spectroscopy, to observe molecules desorbed from a surface
 Tornado debris signature on weather radar
 Total dissolved solids in water
 Transderivational search or fuzzy search in psychology

Other uses
 The Daily Show, US TV program
 TopDrawerSoccer.com, a website
 Trump derangement syndrome, term used by supporters of former US President Donald Trump
 Tokyo DisneySea, Japan
 TDS Racing, a French auto racing team
 The Downward Spiral, a 1994 album by Nine Inch Nails

See also

 
 TD (disambiguation)